Ilerda may refer to:

 Ilerda, a synonym for the lycaenid butterfly genus Heliophorus
 Hesperia ilerda, a synonym for Gretna waga species of butterfly
 Ilerda, the name of Lleida in Spain in Ancient Roman times
Battle of Ilerda, 49BC
 Ilerda, a typeface of Nacional Typefoundry, Spain